Thomas Thornton (22 May 1922 – 1 February 1987) was an English first-class cricketer.

While serving in the Royal Air Force, Thornton made a single appearance in first-class cricket for the Royal Air Force against Worcestershire at Worcester in 1946. He was dismissed for 6 runs by Leonard Blunt in the first innings, while in the second innings he was dismissed by Leonard Oakley for 23. He also played second eleven cricket for Yorkshire in 1939 and 1946.

Thornton died from stomach cancer in Elland on 1 February 1987, at the age of 64.

References

External links

1922 births
1987 deaths
20th-century Royal Air Force personnel
English cricketers
People from Elland
Royal Air Force airmen
Royal Air Force cricketers
Deaths from cancer in England